Stefan Edberg was the defending champion, but lost in the final to Jim Courier. The score was 7–6, 3–6, 2–6, 6–0, 7–5 in the final.

Seeds

Draw

Finals

Top half

Bottom half

References

External links
 Official results archive (ATP)
 Official results archive (ITF)

Swiss Indoors - Singles